In enzymology, a cortisol sulfotransferase is an enzyme that catalyzes the chemical reaction

3'-phosphoadenylyl sulfate + cortisol  adenosine 3',5'-bisphosphate + cortisol 21-sulfate

Thus, the two substrates of this enzyme are 3'-phosphoadenylyl sulfate and cortisol, whereas its two products are adenosine 3',5'-bisphosphate and cortisol 21-sulfate.

This enzyme belongs to the family of transferases, specifically the sulfotransferases, which transfer sulfur-containing groups.  The systematic name of this enzyme class is 3'-phosphoadenylyl-sulfate:cortisol 21-sulfotransferase. Other names in common use include glucocorticosteroid sulfotransferase, and glucocorticoid sulfotransferase.

References

 
 

EC 2.8.2
Enzymes of unknown structure